The 2009 Tonga undersea volcanic eruption began on 16 March 2009, near the island of Hunga Tonga, approximately  from the Tongan capital of Nukuʻalofa. The volcano is in a highly active volcanic region that represents a portion of the Pacific Ring of Fire. It is estimated that there are up to 36 undersea volcanoes clustered together in the area.

Eruption history
The initial 16–17 March eruption created an  ejecta column (tephra) which sent ash and smoke up to  into the atmosphere and an initial inspection reported that the volcano had breached the ocean surface. Authorities suggested at that time that the eruption did not yet pose any threat to the capital's population, and an inspection team was sent out to evaluate the volcano.

But on 21 March, an eruption sent steam and ash just  into the sky. The eruption devastated Hunga Haapai, covering it in black ash and stripping it of vegetation and fauna.

Disruptions
Two Air New Zealand airline flights into Tonga were delayed due to safety concerns caused by the volcanic ash, but flight schedules returned to normal shortly thereafter.

Tongan officials also expressed concern that the eruption could significantly harm the country's fishing industry.

2009 Tonga earthquake

Four days after the start of the eruption a strong earthquake measuring 7.6  also struck the region. Ken Hudnut, a geophysicist for the United States Geological Survey, stated that "The association with the volcanic activity seems to be an interesting added dimension to this. It's not clear at this point that there is a direct association, but it seems suggestive at this point.". Keleti Mafi, the Tongan government's chief seismologist, also suggested that the earthquake was likely to have a direct impact on the volcanic eruption, stating that the "strength of the earthquake could crack the volcano's (undersea) vent and allow more magma to be ejected".

See also

 2022 Hunga Tonga–Hunga Ha'apai eruption and tsunami
 Tonga Trench – deepest trench in the Southern hemisphere where the Pacific Plate is being subducted westward

Notes

References

External links
 Footage of the eruption, BBC website
 

Submarine eruptions
Surtseyan eruptions
Volcano
Volcanic eruption
2009 natural disasters
Tonga undersea volcanic eruption
March 2009 events in Oceania
Tonga
2009 disasters in Oceania